Séverine (1855–1929) was a French journalist, anarchist, and feminist

Séverine may also refer to:

 Séverine (given name), a female given name
 Séverine (singer) (born 1948), French singer who won the Eurovision Song Contest 1971
 Sévérine, a character in the James Bond movie Skyfall

See also 
 Severin (disambiguation)
 Severina (disambiguation)